SCARS or S.C.A.R.S. is an acronym that may refer to:

 SCARS (military) (Special Combat Aggressive Reactionary System), an American combat fighting system
 Severe cutaneous adverse reactions, often abbreviated as SCARs, i.e. the last letter is lower case
 S.C.A.R.S. (video game) (Super Computer Animal Racing Simulator), a video game featuring cars that are shaped like animals

See also
 Scar (disambiguation)
 SCAR (disambiguation)
 Scarred (disambiguation)